Persistence may refer to:

Math and computers 
 Image persistence, in LCD monitors
 Persistence (computer science), the characteristic of data that outlives the execution of the program that created it
 Persistence of a number, a mathematical quality of numbers
 Persistent data structure, a data structure that always preserves the previous version of itself when it is modified
 Persistent world, in virtual reality and computer games

Science 
 Multidrug tolerance, a dormant, persistent state of a bacterial population
 Persistence (botany), describing plant parts that remain attached to the plant after completing their function
 Persistence (discontinuity), a concept in geotechnical engineering
 Persistence (linguistics), a principle of grammaticalization
 Persistence (psychology), a personality trait
 Persistence of vision, a theory on how the illusion of motion in films is achieved
 Persistence forecasting, predicting the future to be the same as the present

Other 
 Persistence (log canoe), an 1890s Chesapeake Bay log canoe
 Persist, Oregon, a ghost town in Jackson County, U.S.
 Persistence, a 2005 demo by Konkhra
 The Persistence, a first-person horror game developed by Firesprite
 Persistence the rover

See also
Persistent (disambiguation)
The Persistence of Memory (disambiguation)